St. Charles Township or Saint Charles Township may refer to the following places in the United States:

 St. Charles Township, Kane County, Illinois
 Saint Charles Township, Floyd County, Iowa
 St. Charles Township, Michigan, in Saginaw County
 St. Charles Township, Winona County, Minnesota
 St. Charles Township, Cuming County, Nebraska

See also
Saint Charles (disambiguation)

Township name disambiguation pages